Monte Accellica is a mountain in the Monti Picentini range, located in Campania, Italy. The mountain is 1660 metres (5446 feet) tall, and is situated on the border between the provinces of Salerno and Avellino, divided between the comuni of Acerno, Giffoni Valle Piana, and Montella. Several rivers typical of the region have their sources on the slopes of Monte Accellica, including the Picentino, the Tusciano, and the Calore Irpino, which is itself the largest tributary of the Volturno. In the local dialects, the mountain is called Céleca or Acéleca.

Monte Accellica is located within the Terminio Cervialto Mountain Community, as well as Monti Picentini Regional Park. Part of the southern face of the mountain is included in the Oasi Monte Accellica natural reserve, managed by WWF Italia.

External links
MONTE ACELLICA, by Francesco Raffaele

Mountains of Campania
Acella